This article is about the 2023 flower protests in Russia.  There have also been other flower protests, e.g. in Myanmar in 2021 on Suu Kyi's 76th birthday

Flower protests are a wave of peaceful, silent protests in Russia, started in January 2023, against the 2022 Russian invasion of Ukraine.  Citizens in various cities in Russia choose places that have some connection to Ukraine or to repression during the Soviet era, and put flowers and other objects there.  By 7 February 2023, this had spread to at least 60 Russian cities.

Background 

The 2022 Russian invasion of Ukraine has had strong support among a majority of the Russian population, much because Russian state controlled mass media have been strongly pro-war and independent Russian newspapers, TV stations, radio stations and web sites have been forcibly closed down.

Shortly after the massive Russian attacks on Ukraine on 24 February 2022, there were some protests against the war in several Russian cities, but the Russian authorities imprisoned thousands of demonstrators and the demonstrations could not be continued on a large scale.  In September 2022, there was another wave of protests in Russia, this time against military mobilization, but also this protest wave was stopped by the Russian authorities.  

As the Russian military progress in Ukraine slowed down around the summer of 2022, the Russian military increased the focus on using cruise missiles and  drones against civilian targets in Ukraine.

Russians risk up to 10 years in prison, in severe cases 15 years, for disclosing what Russia is doing in Ukraine.

Protests 

On January 14 2023, a Russian Kh-22 cruise missile hit an apartment building block in Dnipro, Ukraine and killed at least 46 persons, 5 of them children, and injured another 80.  Pictures of this were spread in news media and social media.  Soon after, flowers appeared on the monument of Ukrainian national poet Taras Shevchenko in central St Petersburg.  In Moscow, the same thing happened next to a statue of the Ukrainian poet Larisa Kosach-Kvitka, also known by her pen name as Lesya Ukrainka, near Moscow's Kyiv Railway Station.  The Russian police started removing flowers and arresting people who came with more flowers.

By 3 February 2023 the protests had spread to at least 60 cities in Russia.

At least 7 people have been detained.

The flowers are often yellow roses, sometimes with yellow and blue ribbons.  Teddy bears, written notes, lit candles, and pictures of the destroyed apartment building block, are also being put down.

Russian version 

Russian authorities said that they were not aiming at civilian targets on 14 January 2023.  

People who put down flowers in protest against Russian warfare, are said to breach article 280.3 in the Russian criminal code, which prohibits “public actions aimed at discrediting the use of the armed forces of the Russian Federation".

References

2023 in Russia
2023 protests
Anti-war protests in Russia
Reactions to the 2022 Russian invasion of Ukraine